Laura Reyes Retana Ramos (born 10 September 1955) is a Mexican politician affiliated with  the Institutional Revolutionary Party. She served as Deputy of the LIX Legislature of the Mexican Congress representing Coahuila, and previously served in the Congress of Coahuila.

References

1955 births
Living people
Politicians from Torreón
Women members of the Chamber of Deputies (Mexico)
Institutional Revolutionary Party politicians
Party of the Democratic Revolution politicians
Autonomous University of Coahuila alumni
Members of the Congress of Coahuila
21st-century Mexican politicians
21st-century Mexican women politicians
Deputies of the LIX Legislature of Mexico
Members of the Chamber of Deputies (Mexico) for Coahuila